Selenge is a sum (district) of Bulgan Province in northern Mongolia. In 2009, its population was 3,271.

References 

Districts of Bulgan Province